Lee Township is a township in Norman County, Minnesota, United States. The population was 159 at the 2000 census.

Lee Township was organized in 1882, and named for Ole Lee, a Norwegian settler.

Geography

Demographics
As of the census of 2000, there were 159 people, 58 households, and 45 families residing in the township. The population density was 4.0 people per square mile (1.5/km2). There were 71 housing units at an average density of 1.8/sq mi (0.7/km2). The racial makeup of the township was 100.00% White.

There were 58 households, out of which 39.7% had children under the age of 18 living with them, 75.9% were married couples living together, 1.7% had a female householder with no husband present, and 20.7% were non-families. 19.0% of all households were made up of individuals, and 6.9% had someone living alone who was 65 years of age or older. The average household size was 2.74 and the average family size was 3.15.

In the township the population was spread out, with 28.9% under the age of 18, 4.4% from 18 to 24, 28.3% from 25 to 44, 26.4% from 45 to 64, and 11.9% who were 65 years of age or older. The median age was 42 years. For every 100 females, there were 117.8 males. For every 100 females age 18 and over, there were 109.3 males.

The median income for a household in the township was $49,375, and the median income for a family was $52,500. Males had a median income of $34,375 versus $25,417 for females. The per capita income for the township was $19,519. None of the population or families were below the poverty line.

References

Townships in Norman County, Minnesota
Townships in Minnesota